Loïc Kervran (born 11 February 1984) is a French politician of Horizons who was elected to the French National Assembly on 18 June 2017, representing the department of Cher.

Political career
In parliament, Kervran serves as member of the Committee on National Defense and the Armed Forces. In addition to his committee assignments, he is part of the parliamentary friendship groups with Jordan, Lebanon and Yemen.

In July 2019, Kervran decided not to align with his parliamentary group's majority and became one of 52 LREM members who abstained from a vote on the French ratification of the European Union’s Comprehensive Economic and Trade Agreement (CETA) with Canada.

See also
 2017 French legislative election

References

1984 births
Living people
Deputies of the 15th National Assembly of the French Fifth Republic
La République En Marche! politicians
Place of birth missing (living people)
Deputies of the 16th National Assembly of the French Fifth Republic